Nardilysin (N-arginine dibasic convertase, NRD-convertase) is an enzyme. This enzyme catalyses the following chemical reaction

 Hydrolysis of polypeptides, preferably at -Xaa-Arg-Lys-, and less commonly at -Arg-Arg-Xaa-, in which Xaa is not Arg or Lys

This enzyme is present rat brain and testis.

References

External links 
 

EC 3.4.24